Ina Albowitz (born 26 August 1943) is a German politician of the Free Democratic Party (FDP) and former member of the German Bundestag.

Life 
From 1990 to 1998 Ina Albowitz was a member of the German Bundestag. From 1992 to 1998 she was Parliamentary Secretary of the FDP parliamentary group. On June 6, 2000, she rejoined the Bundestag as successor to the retired member of parliament Jürgen Möllemann.

Literature

References

1943 births
Members of the Bundestag for North Rhine-Westphalia
Members of the Bundestag 1998–2002
Members of the Bundestag 1994–1998
Members of the Bundestag 1990–1994
Female members of the Bundestag
20th-century German women politicians
21st-century German women politicians
Members of the Bundestag for the Free Democratic Party (Germany)
Living people